The Bregenz Forest Railway (known colloquially as the Wälderbahn or Wälderbähnle), is an Austrian narrow gauge railway with a track gauge of , the so-called Bosnian gauge. It runs through the state of Vorarlberg and from 1902 to 1983 linked Bregenz on Lake Constance with Bezau in the Bregenz Forest on a 35.33 kilometre long railway line. Today only a 5.01 kilometre long section is still worked as a heritage railway. The remaining line has been closed and largely lifted.

Heritage railway 

In 1985 the Bregenz Forest Railway Society (Verein Bregenzerwaldbahn-Museumsbahn) was founded in order to at least preserve sections of the line and to operate it as a heritage railway. The original vehicles had, however, all been transported away, which is why operations began in 1987 only with the help of rolling stock procured from other lines, including a regauged trailer car from the Stubai Valley Railway. The line was opened from Bezau as far as Schwarzenberg station. The first powered vehicle was a lorry converted to a railbus. Several small diesel locomotives and other wagons from the Stubai Valley Railway were procured the following year and a further section of line to the Bersbuch station was reactivated.

The first steam locomotive at the museum railway arrived in the early 1990s - the former 798.101 "Nicki S." - on loan when it had become superfluous as a result of the closure of the Jagst Valley Railway. In 1993, the U.25 was renovated to become the first operational steam locomotive - a "Class U" - from the original Bregenz Forest Railway. In 2001 it was followed by a second steam engine, the Uh. The passenger coaches required were built on the chassis of goods wagons. The 1999 Pentecost flood destroyed the Sporenegg bridge and it was rebuilt in June 2000. The 2005 European floods caused further damage to the trackbed, and flooding of Bezau station. This was repaired within a few weeks.

Today the museum railway services operate on the remaining section of line from Bezau to Schwarzenberg. An extension to Andelsbuch, or even beyond that to Egg, was considered. However, in October 2004, the line had to be shortened by 1.1 kilometres (and a new Schwarzenberg terminus built), because the line between Schwarzenberg and Bersbuch was given up in favour of a road expansion project. Furthermore, the Railway Society had to forfeit land at the Bezau station for the building of a supermarket. As a replacement for the locomotive shed, a new vehicle and workshop hall was built and, in place of a set of points, a sector table was built at the end of the line in order to make optimum use of the remaining space.

Literature 
 Markus Rabanser, Martin Hebenstreit: Die Bregenzerwaldbahn. Hecht-Verlag, 1989, 
 Krobot, Slezak, Sternhart: Schmalspurig durch Österreich. 4th ed., Verlag Slezak, 1991, 
 Lothar Beer: Eine Bahn im Rhythmus der Zeit - Die Geschichte der Bregenzerwald-Museumsbahn. Hecht-Verlag, 2007, 
 Norbert Fink: Die Bregenzerwaldbahn 1902-1983 illustrated book, Sutton Verlag comments and press release accessible online

External links 

 Website of the Bregenz Forest Railway
 Thomas Hammerer:Die Bregenzerwaldbahn - früher - heute Comprehensive documentation from 2009/2010 on the 30th anniversary of its closure.
 Reiner Schruft: Bregenz-Bezau at Vergessene Bahnen. Situation in 2009 based on 6 sections of line
 1976 video

References 

Heritage railways in Austria
Museums in Vorarlberg
History of Vorarlberg
760 mm gauge railways in Austria
Transport in Vorarlberg